Leucopaxillus is a genus of fairly large white-spored gilled mushrooms which are found worldwide growing on the ground in woodlands.  These are saprotrophs, but may sometimes be ectomycorrhizal.  Less than ten species of Leucopaxillus are known to grow in North America.  No species of Leucopaxillus are known to be poisonous, but they do not have an appealing taste or texture. The widespread genus contains about 15 species.

Members of Leucopaxillus are medium-sized to large, have a dry convex to depressed cap, an inrolled margin when young, lack a partial veil and have tough flesh.  They have white or yellowish gills which can come off in a layer, leaving the underside of the cap smooth.  The spores are white, amyloid and spiny.   These mushrooms often smell bad and can be mistaken for Tricholoma and Clitocybe, but mushrooms in those genera are more fragile and rot more quickly.  Members of Leucopaxillus have antibiotics which make the mushrooms persist much longer than most, making them appear to be more common than they actually are.

Selected species
 Leucopaxillus albissimus
 Leucopaxillus gentianeus
 Leucopaxillus giganteus
 Leucopaxillus gracillimus
 Leucopaxillus lepistoides
 Leucopaxillus paradoxus
 Leucopaxillus subzonalis
 Leucopaxillus compactus

See also
List of Tricholomataceae genera

References

External links
Mushroom Expert - The Genus Leucopaxillus - Includes Key

Further reading
Singer R, Smith AH. (1943). A monograph on the genus Leucopaxillus Boursier. Papers of the Michigan Academy of Science 28: 85–132.
Singer R, Smith AH. (1947). Additional notes on the genus Leucopaxillus. Mycologia 39: 725–736.

Tricholomataceae
Agaricales genera